Tukzar is a town in Sancharak district of Sar-e Pol Province, Afghanistan. The town is the administrative centre of Sancharak district.

Climate
Tukzar has a hot-summer humid continental climate (Köppen: Dsa) with hot summers and cool winters. In winter, there is much more rainfall in Tokzar than in summer.

July is the warmest month of the year, the temperature in July averages .

See also
 Sar-e Pol Province

References 

Geography of Afghanistan
Populated places in Sar-e Pol Province